The Angola colobus (Colobus angolensis), Angolan black-and-white colobus, or Angolan colobus  is a primate species of Old World monkey belonging to the genus Colobus.

Taxonomy 
There are six recognized subspecies and one undescribed subspecies from the Mahale Mountains in Tanzania:
Angola colobus, Colobus angolensis
Sclater's Angola colobus, C. a. subsp. angolensis
Powell-Cotton's Angola colobus, C. a. subsp. cottoni
Ruwenzori colobus C. a. subsp. ruwenzorii 
Cordier's Angola colobus, C. a. subsp. cordieri
Prigogine's Angola colobus, C. a. subsp. prigoginei
Peters Angola colobus or Tanzanian black-and-white colobus, C. a. subsp. palliatus

Physical characteristics 

Like all black-and-white colobi, the Angola colobus has black fur and a black face, surrounded by long, white locks of hair. It also has a mantle of white hair on the shoulders. The long, thin tail can be either black or white, but the tip is always white. There is a significant regional variation in the total amount of white on the body and the length of the fur. Animals that live in the mountains have longer, thicker fur than animals from the lowlands to protect them against the cold.

The Angola colobus has a head-body length of 50 to 70 cm, with the males usually being larger than females. The tail is about 75 cm long, and the body weight varies between 9 and 20 kg.

Distribution and habitat 
The Angola colobus occurs in dense rainforests, both in the lowlands and coastal mountains. It lives in most of the Congo Basin, to the south and northeast of the Congo River, as far as Ruwenzori, Burundi and southwestern Uganda. The species can also be found in East Africa, especially in the interior and coastal forests of Kenya and Tanzania and in isolated mountain areas. Although the species is named after Angola, it is quite rare in that country. Of all Colobus species, the Angola colobus occurs in the southernmost latitudes. The geographical range lies south of that of the mantled guereza. It is found up to 2,415 m above sea level in Kenya.

Ecology and behaviour 
All Colobus species are very sociable and live in groups of up to several hundred animals, although most groups are much smaller. Their diet consists of mostly leaves, but also lesser amounts of fruit and seeds.

References

External links 

Angolan Black & White Colobus

Angola colobus
Fauna of Central Africa
Angola colobus
Mammals of Burundi
Mammals of the Democratic Republic of the Congo
Mammals of Kenya
Mammals of Malawi
Mammals of Mozambique
Mammals of Rwanda
Mammals of Tanzania
Mammals of Uganda
Mammals of Zambia
Angola colobus
Angola colobus